Signs for the Fallen is the sixth studio album by the German melodic death metal band Suidakra.

Track listing 
 "Revenant" – 5:05
 "Crown the Lost" – 4:36
 "Threnody" – 1:42
 "Trails of Gore" – 4:35
 "The Ember Died" – 0:21
 "When Eternity Echoes" – 2:02
 "Signs for the Fallen" – 5:37
 "Dimorphic" – 4:20
 "Bound in Changes" – 8:50
 "A Vision's Demise" - 5:09

Personnel 
 Arkadius Antonik – lead, rhythm, melodic, acoustic guitars & main vocals
 Marcel Schoenen – melodic, acoustic guitars & clean vocals
 Marcus Riewaldt- bass
 Lars Wehner – drums & percussion
 Andy Classen – engineering & mastering
 Mike Bohatch - covert art
 Nils Bross - Suidakra logo

External links 
 Track list and lyrics on suidakra.com

2003 albums
Suidakra albums